C. major may refer to:
 Ceramornis major, an extinct bird species from the Late Cretaceous
 Cettia major, the chestnut-crowned bush warbler, a warbler species found in South Asia
 Clusia major, the autograph tree or pitch-apple, a plant species
 Copiula major, a frog species found in Indonesia and possibly Papua New Guinea
 Ctenacanthus major, a prehistoric fish species

See also
 Major (disambiguation)
 C major – a key in music